frog (styled as "frog, part of Capgemini Invent") is a global creative and design consultancy founded in 1969 by industrial designer Hartmut Esslinger in Mutlangen, Germany, where it was initially named “esslinger design”. Soon after the company moved to Altensteig, Germany, and then opened a new studio in Palo Alto, California, and ultimately to its current headquarters in San Francisco, California. The company has studios in North and Central America, Europe, and Asia.

The name was changed to frog design in 1982 (the name originating from an acronym for Esslinger's home country, the Federal Republic of Germany; it was originally styled exclusively in lower-case as an expression of its belief in a democratic place of work, where ideas are openly and freely shared, and in opposition to the capitalization of nouns in German). The brand was once again restyled as frog in 2011 to signify an expanded portfolio of services that included strategy and organization activation.

The company was acquired by Capgemini in 2021 and is now a part of Capgemini Invent.

History 
The firm's first designs, in 1969, were for WEGA, a German radio and television manufacturer that was later acquired by Sony. frog continued to work for Sony and designed the Trinitron television receiver in 1975, and several editions of the Walkman. Their first designs for computer manufacturers were for proprietary systems by CTM (Computertechnik Müller) in 1970 and Diehl Data Systems in 1979. More prominent are the designs for Apple Computer, starting with the case of the portable Apple IIc, introducing the Snow White design language used by Apple during 1984–1990, and continuing with several Macintosh models. The firm designed the NeXT Computer in 1987 and Sun's SPARCstations in 1989. More recently, the firm is known for its work with General Electric (2010-2015) and on Disney's Magicbands and MyMagic+ (launched 2015).

In August 2004, the company announced that Flextronics International, a large electronics manufacturing services provider, was taking an equity stake in the company for approximately $25 million; in 2006, frog was part of a deal through which private equity firm Kohlberg Kravis Roberts & Co. (KKR) acquired nine of Flextronic's assets. frog was later acquired by engineering firm Aricent, which itself was acquired by Altran, which in 2019 was in turn acquired by its current parent company, the consulting firm Capgemini. Today, frog is organized under the “Capgemini Invent” umbrella, integrating staff from Fahrenheit 212, Idean, June21, and Capgemini Invent into the frog brand.

Gallery

See also
 Apple Industrial Design Group
 RKS Design
 IDEO
 Designworks
 Smart Design

References

External links 
 

Industrial design firms
Design companies of the United States
Companies based in San Francisco
Design companies established in 1969
1969 establishments in West Germany
German companies established in 1969
International management consulting firms